The 2013–14 Western Football League season (known as the 2013–14 Toolstation Western Football League for sponsorship reasons) was the 112th in the history of the Western Football League, a football competition in England. Teams were divided into two divisions; the Premier and the First.

The league champions for the second time in their history were Larkhall Athletic, who were promoted to the Southern League. The champions of Division One were Bradford Town.

Premier Division
The Premier Division featured three new clubs in a league of 21, increased from 20 the previous season after Barnstaple Town and Wells City were relegated to the First Division:
Hengrove Athletic, runners-up in Division One.
Sherborne Town, champions of Division One.
Slimbridge, transferred from the Hellenic League.
Plymouth Parkway of the South West Peninsula League applied for promotion to the Western League, and the club finished in a promotion position, but they ultimately refused promotion on financial grounds.

Promotion applications to the Southern League
The four clubs that applied for promotion to Step 4 were: Brislington, Bristol Manor Farm, Hallen and Larkhall Athletic. Gillingham Town did not apply.

League table

First Division
The First Division featured five new clubs after Hengrove Athletic and Sherborne Town were promoted to the Premier Division, Shrewton United resigned, and Elmore transferred to the South West Peninsula League:
Ashton & Backwell United, promoted from the Somerset County League.
Barnstaple Town, relegated from the Premier Division.
Chippenham Park, promoted from the Wiltshire League.
Wells City, relegated from the Premier Division.
Wincanton Town, promoted from the Dorset Premier League.

Clubs that applied for a transfer to this division:
Tytherington Rocks (Hellenic League) – Transfer turned down

Other clubs that applied for promotion to this division:
Bristol Academy (Gloucestershire County League)
Minehead (Somerset County League)
Tuffley Rovers (Gloucestershire County League) – Accepted into the Hellenic League

Ashton & Backwell finished third in their league, with Minehead second, but Ashton & Backwell were listed for promotion instead of Minehead in a League press release on 24 May, after Minehead failed the ground grading. Chippenham Park and Wincanton Town were also listed.

Cribbs Friends Life F.C. changed their name to Cribbs F.C. after losing the backing of their sponsors.

League table

References
 League tables

External links
 Western League Official Site

2013-14
9